"Swear" is a song recorded by Chinese singer Alan. "Swear" was written by Aico and Yuka Miyagawa and was produced by Kazuhito Kikuchi. The song was used as the theme song of Bourbon's Blanchul Mini Series commercial, in which Alan appears. The PV for the single was shot at Keisei Rose Garden. The B-side, "Beauty", was used as the commercial song for Yomeishu's Re:on Nutrition Drink Product. "Swear" was released as a truetone on September 17, 2009 and was released as a single on the Avex Trax label on November 4, 2009. "Swear" reached a peak of #35 on the weekly Oricon charts, and charted for three weeks.

Promotion
To promote the single, Alan appeared on Music Japan and sang "Swear". She also performed the song on Music Station.

Track listing

References

2009 singles
2009 songs
Alan Dawa Dolma songs
Avex Trax singles
Songs with music by Kazuhito Kikuchi